Marques Harris (born September 20, 1981) is a former American football linebacker. He was signed by the Chargers an undrafted free agent in 2005. He played college football at Southern Utah.

Harris has also played for the San Francisco 49ers.

Early years
Harris played high school football at Grand Junction High School in Grand Junction, Colorado. During his senior year, he was named all-state by Denver Post and Rocky Mountain News. He also was a star wrestler, winning a state title in the 189-pound weight class as a senior.

He also played baseball as a catcher and outfielder.

College career
Harris played college football at Colorado and Southern Utah University. He played at Colorado from 2000–2003, totaling 133 tackles, 10 sacks and two interceptions. Before his senior year he transferred to Southern Utah where he earned third-team All-America by Sports Network and first-team All-Great West Football Conference after recording 68 tackles and 11 sacks.

Professional career

First stint with Chargers
After not getting drafted in the 2005 NFL Draft, Harris signed as an undrafted free agent with the San Diego Chargers. He spent most of his career with the Chargers on special teams and as a pass rushing specialist. He is also known for doing a backflip after getting a sack.

San Francisco 49ers
Harris was signed by the San Francisco 49ers on April 30, 2009. He was waived on October 27.

Second stint with Chargers
Harris was re-signed by the Chargers on December 1, 2009.

References

External links
San Francisco 49ers bio

1981 births
Living people
Players of American football from Salt Lake City
American football linebackers
Colorado Buffaloes football players
Southern Utah Thunderbirds football players
San Diego Chargers players
San Francisco 49ers players